Abbakumovo is a rural locality (a village) in Vladimir, Vladimir Oblast, Russia. The population was 25 as of 2010. There are 2 streets.

Geography 
Abbakumovo is located 16 km southeast of Vladimir (the district's administrative centre) by road. Shepelevo is the nearest rural locality.

References 

Rural localities in Vladimir Urban Okrug